Helitron is a mixed choir operating in Tallinn and originally set up to cater to employees of Tondi Elektroonika. Of the employment-related choirs established during Soviet occupation of Estonia, Helitron was one of the most famous ones, and is one of the few ones who have outlived the USSR.

A number of people who participated in the Singing Revolution in musical rôles have at some point in their life been involved with Helitron, as either a singer in it, or as a conductor or arranger.

Repertory 
The choir has been singing baroque and religious music and is also known for its chamber music performances. Before the dissolution of Soviet Union, it also performed Soviet music.

On 1 May 1975, Helitron was the first choir to perform Mõistatused (Estonian for Puzzles), an orchestral piece based on Estonian folk songs by Ester Mägi.

Conductors 
In 1964, Harald-Peter Siiak became the chief conductor of Helitron.

In 1998–2004, the chief conductor of Helitron was Veronika Portsmuth.

References 

Estonian musical groups
Culture in Tallinn